Levron Williams was a professional football player with the San Diego Chargers.

Early life
Williams attended Benjamin Bosse High School in Evansville, Indiana. He was named the 1996 Gatorade Indiana High School Football Player of the Year in 1996 after a tremendous junior year.

College career

Indiana Hoosiers
Williams chose to continue his football career at Indiana University on scholarship, playing for Cam Cameron.

He appeared in nine games as a freshman, but it wasn't until his sophomore year that he became a big part of the Hoosier offense. Williams accounted for over 1,000 total yards during his sophomore campaign, with 817 yards coming on the ground. He was a key cog again as a junior, scoring ten touchdowns and amassing another 821 rushing yards.

As a senior in 2001, Williams and quarterback Antwaan Randle El formed one of the Big Ten's most dynamic offensive duos. He set career-highs in rushing yards (1,401) and touchdowns (17), including a record-setting six-touchdown performance in a 63–20 win at Wisconsin, the Hoosiers' first victory of the season. Williams twice went over the 200-yard mark in that season, also accomplishing the feat by rushing for 251 yards in a road win at Michigan State in November. Williams was selected to the All-Big Ten First-team along with Wisconsin's Anthony Davis after finishing the 2001 season with 1,401 rushing yards. However, despite a 4-4 league record, Indiana's best since the Bill Mallory era, they fell one win short of bowl eligibility (5-6). Williams finished his career without appearing in a postseason game.

In his Indiana career, Williams accounted for over 3,000 rushing yards (3,095), over 1,000 receiving yards (1,088) and 38 touchdowns. He remains the Hoosiers' sixth-all-time leading rusher and third all-time leader in rushing touchdowns.

Professional career

San Diego Chargers
After not hearing his named called in the 2002 NFL Draft, Williams signed with the San Diego Chargers on April 23, 2002. He never appeared in an NFL game.

References

1979 births
Living people
American football wide receivers
Calgary Stampeders players
San Diego Chargers players
Evansville BlueCats players
Indiana Hoosiers football players
Players of American football from Indiana